A gig bag (or gigbag) is a padded, soft-sided bag used for the storage and transport of musical instruments, most commonly a guitar or bass guitar. A popular alternative to the usually heavier, more cumbersome hard shell cases, most gig bags include pockets for storage of sheet music, instrument cables, picks, straps, and other accessories, along with shoulder straps and grab handles for added comfort, portability, and ease of use.

Larger gig bags are used for the double bass.

While gig bags are lighter and easier to carry, they offer much less protection than padded hard shell or wooden cases. As such, some musicians will own both soft gig bags and hard shell cases for their instruments. This way, they can use the gig bag for local rehearsals, session work, and gigs, and use the hard shell case when their instrument will be checked onto airline baggage.

References

Citations

Bags
Musical instrument parts and accessories